Hecyra obscurator is a species of beetle in the family Cerambycidae. It was described by Johan Christian Fabricius in 1801. It is known from Angola, Guinea, Ghana, Mozambique, Senegal, the Central African Republic, the Democratic Republic of the Congo, Cameroon, and Nigeria.

References

Crossotini
Beetles described in 1801